Acceptance is a 2009 television drama film starring Mae Whitman and Joan Cusack. The film was first aired on August 22, 2009, on Lifetime. It is based on the book Acceptance: A Novel by Susan Coll. The film was directed by Sanaa Hamri.

Premise
High school student and overachiever Taylor Rockefeller must deal with the pressures of the college admissions process. She also cuts her wrists. She struggles with finding her dream colleges. In the meantime, her mother wants her to go to a top college so she can find a suitable husband. Taylor's parents are about to break up. Taylor realizes that lowly ranked Yates College is the right choice. However, her mother disagrees.

Cast 
 Mae Whitman as Taylor Rockefeller
 Joan Cusack as Nina Rockefeller
 Mark Moses as Wilson Rockefeller
 Deepti Daryanani as Maya
 Jonathan Keltz as Harry Burton
 Mike Pniewski as Basil Dickerson
 Kiersten Warren as Grace
 Robert Pralgo as Ari
 Rob Mayes as Justin Smelling

References

External links
 

2009 drama films
2009 television films
2009 films
American teen drama films
Lifetime (TV network) films
Films directed by Sanaa Hamri
American drama television films
2000s English-language films
2000s American films